Amarante may refer to:

 Amarante, Portugal, municipality in northern Portugal
 Amarante, Piauí, municipality in Piauí, Brazil
 Amarante do Maranhão, municipality in Maranhão, Brazil
 Catello Amarante (rower, born 1979), Italian rower
 Catello Amarante (rower, born 1990), Italian rower
 Carlos Amarante (1748-1815), Portuguese engineer and architect
 Rodrigo Amarante (b. 1976), Brazilian guitarist

See also
 Amaranth (disambiguation)

ja:アマランス (曖昧さ回避)